The Scleronychophora or armoured lobopods are a group of lobopodians (such as the hallucigeniids and microdictyon) that bear a robust dorsal armature of paired plates.

References 

Lobopodia
Cambrian invertebrates
Prehistoric animal orders